Mark Andrew Butchers (born 1959) is a British Anglican priest who served as Archdeacon of Barnstaple, 2015– 2020.

He was educated at Trinity College, Cambridge (BA, 1981) and King's College London (MTh, 1990; PhD, 2006). Ordained in 1988 after a period of study at Chichester Theological College, he began his career with curacies in Chelsea and Mitcham. After this he was Team Rector of North Tawton, Bondleigh and Sampford Courtenay with Honeychurch then Chaplain and Fellow of Keble College, Oxford. From 2010 to 2015 he was Vicar of Wolvercote; and from 2012 also Area Dean of Oxford. On 6 September 2020, he became Principal of the South West Ministry Training Course.

References

1959 births
Archdeacons of Barnstaple
Living people
Alumni of Trinity College, Cambridge
Alumni of King's College London
Alumni of Chichester Theological College